Gordon Heights is a hamlet and census-designated place (CDP) in the Town of Brookhaven, Suffolk County, Long Island, New York, United States. The population was 3,981 at the 2020 census.

History
Gordon Heights had its beginnings in the early 1920s, when developer Louis Fife went to Black neighborhoods in New York City (Harlem, Brooklyn, and The Bronx) with the offer of land and a better life on Long Island. Land was offered as low as $10 down and $10 monthly or $10 weekly.

Promoted as a place that would be a solid, close-knit community of small farms, the pilgrimage to Long Island began in 1927. Gordon Heights was named after "Pop" Gordon, a man who had previously owned most of the land that became part of the new community.

A civic association was formed to address the need of area residents. It would later become known as the Gordon Heights Progressive Association, which was founded in 1945. This group was the parent body of the Gordon Heights Fire Department.

Geography

Demographics

2020 census

Note: the US Census treats Hispanic/Latino as an ethnic category. This table excludes Latinos from the racial categories and assigns them to a separate category. Hispanics/Latinos can be of any race.

2010 Census
As of the census of 2000, there were 3,094 people, 856 households, and 678 families residing in the CDP. The population density was 1,827.0 per square mile (706.9/km2). There were 945 housing units at an average density of 558.0/sq mi (215.9/km2). The racial makeup of the CDP was  62.12% African American, 24.27% White, 1.36% Native American, 1.91% Asian, 0.03% Pacific Islander, 5.14% from other races, and 5.17% from two or more races. Hispanic or Latino of any race were 14.51% of the population.

There were 856 households, out of which 45.4% had children under the age of 18 living with them, 47.9% were married couples living together, 24.8% had a female householder with no husband present, and 20.7% were non-families. 14.7% of all households were made up of individuals, and 4.6% had someone living alone who was 65 years of age or older. The average household size was 3.53 and the average family size was 3.83.

In the CDP, the population was spread out, with 35.2% under the age of 18, 7.9% from 18 to 24, 29.4% from 25 to 44, 18.7% from 45 to 64, and 8.7% who were 65 years of age or older. The median age was 31 years. For every 100 females, there were 95.1 males. For every 100 females age 18 and over, there were 91.0 males.

The median income for a household in the CDP was $56,250, and the median income for a family was $54,450. Males had a median income of $39,120 versus $31,797 for females. The per capita income for the CDP was $17,516. About 8.9% of families and 10.5% of the population were below the poverty threshold, including 10.7% of those under age 18 and 8.3% of those age 65 or over.

Education

School district 
Gordon Heights is located entirely within the boundaries of (and is thus served by) the Longwood Central School District.

Library district 
Gordon Heights is located within the boundaries of the Longwood Library District.

Transportation
Gordon Heights is served by the S60 bus, operated by Suffolk County Transit. The route passes through Port Jefferson before ending at the Smith Haven Mall.

References

External links
 Gordon Heights Archive
 Gordon Heights History (Longwood Public Library)

Brookhaven, New York
Hamlets in New York (state)
Census-designated places in New York (state)
Census-designated places in Suffolk County, New York
Hamlets in Suffolk County, New York